This is a list of episodes of the British television programme Auf Wiedersehen, Pet.

Series overview

Episodes

Series 1 (1983–84)

Series 2 (1986)

Series 3 (2002)

Series 4 (2004)

Christmas specials (2004)

References

External links

Auf Wiedersehen, Pet episodes